From the Dark Side of the Moon is a 2011 album released by singer/songwriter Mary Fahl. The album is a song-by-song "re-imagining" of Pink Floyd's classic 1973 album The Dark Side of the Moon.

Production
As of September 2006 Fahl completed the recording of Mary Fahl: From the Dark Side of the Moon, produced by Mark Doyle and David Werner and mixed by Bob Clearmountain. Doyle also provided nearly all of the instrumentation. The album remained unreleased for several years, during which time the masters were lost in a fire. According to Doyle, "The only choice was to travel to NYC in January and do the whole thing over again. It was well worth doing, as we were able to take advantage of the improvements in technology from even 15 years ago. Fahl released the album  independently on May 10, 2011.

Reception
Publication Nippertown referred to the album as "mindblowing," while The Morton Report called it "brilliant" and "a worthy re-interpretation not to be missed."

Track listing

Personnel
Mary Fahl - vocals, arrangements
Mark Doyle - producer, instrumentation
David Werner - producer
Bob Clearmountain - mixing

See also
The Dark Side of the Moon

References

External links
From the Dark Side of the Moon at Amazon.com

2011 albums
Tributes to The Dark Side of the Moon
Mary Fahl albums